Velda Mound (8LE44) is a Native American archaeological site located in northern Tallahassee, Leon County, Florida, United States. The site was first occupied by peoples of the Fort Walton Culture (a regional variation of the Mississippian culture) in the late prehistoric period and during the protohistoric  period was part of the extensive Apalachee Province of the panhandle. The site is now owned by the State of Florida and managed as a park.

History and use
Velda Mound was built in approximately 1450 by Fort Walton peoples and occupied by their descendants the Apalachee until about 1625. The Spanish explorers called this area Apalachee Province in recognition of the tribe's power, a territory which also included the Lake Jackson Mounds and major center of Anhaica. The platform mound is believed to have served as a residence  for a village leader, with a village surrounding the mound. The village inhabitants cultivated vegetables in small family plots and farmed large communal farming fields in the area around the village. They cultivated numerous varieties of maize, beans and squash.

Velda Mound was abandoned by indigenous peoples by the beginning of the Spanish Mission Period (ca. 1565). This was most likely the result of their depleting nearby natural resources, such as trees for building homes and for firewood.  The soil may have become depleted as well.  The people would move to new lands which were more fertile, and allow older areas to recover. No evidence exists showing occupation of the mound by the later Spanish or British colonists.

In March 1922, a Florida State College for Women instructor, Emma Boyd, was killed when a portion of the mound collapsed while she and her friends were excavating it. During the 1950s, the area around the mound was part of the pastures used by the large Velda Dairy operation. During this era, looters continued digging into the mound to search for artifacts, which damaged the mound and altered its structure. The dairy property was later sold for redevelopment as the Arbor Hill residential subdivision. The mound has since been repaired and is now owned by the State of Florida.

See also
 Leon-Jefferson culture

References

Apalachee
Fort Walton culture
Archaeological sites in Florida
Parks in Tallahassee, Florida
Mounds in Florida
Former populated places in Leon County, Florida